Abrar-ul-Haq is a Pakistani singer-songwriter, philanthropist, and politician. His debut 1995 album Billo De Ghar sold over 40.3million albums worldwide, which made him a household name and granted him the title of "King of Pakistani pop".

Abrar-ul-Haq is the founder and chairman of Sahara for Life Trust, a private organization that has been providing health services to the people of Narowal and surrounding areas since 1998. He was Pakistan Tehreek-e-Insaf's candidate for the seat of National Assembly from constituency NA-78 (Narowal-II) in the 2018 Pakistani general election. On 15 November 2019, he was appointed Chairman of the Pakistan Red Crescent Society (PRCS). He also served as a teacher in Aitchison College for a brief period of time.

Music career 

His first album as singer was Billo De Ghar, which was released in 1995.

Controversies 

Abrar-ul-Haq's songs have been a subject of controversy in Pakistan. After the release of the hit song "Billo De Ghar" in 1995, Urdu newspapers began quoting Islamic scholars of Lahore who were of the opinion that the song was describing a man falling in love with a prostitute and wanting to marry her. Upon the formation of Nawaz Sharif's PML-N majority government after the 1997 election, the song was banned from state-owned TV and radio channels.

In the early 2000s, his song "Nach Punjaban" was met with opposition from those who thought the casual use of the word "Punjaban" was a demeaning way to address Punjabi women, eventually resulting in Abrar-ul-Haq re-recording a version of the song using the word "Majajan" instead.

In 2007, the Supreme Court of Pakistan summoned the singer for an explanation of the song "Parveen" from the album Nara Sada Ishq Aye, alleging that it used the name Parveen in a derogatory manner that would hurt the sentiments of society.

In 2019, his song "Chamkeeli" was the subject of a claim in a civil court in Lahore, with the courts requesting that the song be banned and removed from YouTube alleging that it was humiliating and insulting to both men and women.

Discography

Albums

Studio releases

Television

TEDx Talks

Awards

Philanthropy

Sahara for Life Trust 
Abrar-ul-Haq is the Founder and Chairman of Sahara for Life Trust (SLT), a post he has held since its inception in 1998. SLT is a private organization promoting health and education in remote areas. SAHARA stands for: "Services Aimed at Health and Awakening in Remote Areas". SLT is recognized and registered as a leading charitable organization in Pakistan, the U.K., and the U.S. It is also certified by the Pakistan Center for Philanthropy (PCP) and the U.N. (under the charter of DESA). SLT has been involved in numerous relief and rehabilitation efforts over the years. In 2003, SLT established its first large-scale general hospital in Narowal, Pakistan. The Sughra Shafi Medical Hospital Complex is a PMDC-certified general hospital that provides a wide range of healthcare services to the people of Narowal and its surrounding areas. The location of this hospital also reduced the travel time for patients in critical condition who were unable to travel to major cities in a timely manner, thus saving lives.

Honours and recognition
Tamgha-e-Imtiaz (Medal of Excellence) received from the President of Pakistan on 23 March 2005 for public service / music / philanthropy.
Sitara-e-Eisaar received from the President of Pakistan on 30 June 2006 for outstanding humanitarian relief work during the 8 October 2005 devastating earthquake in Pakistan.
Organization of Islamic Cooperation (OIC) – Appointed Humanitarian Ambassador of the OIC on 11 January 2011.

Political career

Youth Parliament of Pakistan
In 2006, he founded the Youth Parliament of Pakistan (YPP) a non-profit, non-political, and non-religious program that fosters excellence and translates talent in the young people of Pakistan through community service and tangible achievements. Its vision is to empower the young people of Pakistan with the ability to understand their role in society.

Pakistan Tehreek-e-Insaf
In December 2011 Abrar-ul-Haq joined Pakistan Tehreek-e-Insaf.

In 2012, he was appointed as President of the Youth Wing of PTI. In 2013, he was appointed as PTI's Secretary of Foreign Affairs.

He ran for a seat on the National Assembly as PTI's Candidate for Constituency NA-117 (Narowal-III) in the 2013 Pakistani general elections receiving 51,359 votes but lost to PML-N's Ahsan Iqbal.

He was again nominated as PTI's Candidate for National Assembly Constituency NA-78 (Narowal-II) for the 2018 Pakistani general elections but received 88,250 votes and lost again to PML-N's Ahsan Iqbal.

On 15 November 2019, he was appointed Pakistan Red Crescent Society's 16th chairman and assumed office on 27 December 2019.

References

External links 

Living people
Pakistani philanthropists
Pakistani pop singers
Pakistan Tehreek-e-Insaf politicians
Punjabi-language singers
Pakistani dance musicians
Quaid-i-Azam University alumni
People from Narowal District
Punjabi people
1968 births
Recipients of Tamgha-e-Imtiaz
Coke Studio (Pakistani TV program)